Seelan Rengasmy (born 29 October 1964), also known as Seelan Reneasamy, is a British taekwondo practitioner. He competed in the men's featherweight at the 1988 Summer Olympics.

References

External links
 
 
  (as coach)

1964 births
Living people
Place of birth unknown
British male taekwondo practitioners
Olympic taekwondo practitioners of Great Britain
Taekwondo practitioners at the 1988 Summer Olympics
British sports coaches
National team coaches
20th-century British people